Marilda Julia Sanchez (born February 22, 1965) is a Puerto Rican former professional tennis player.

Julia, who comes from San Juan originally, combined her tennis career with studies at the University of Puerto Rico at Mayagüez and made two WTA Tour main draw appearances, at the Puerto Rico Open in 1986 and 1987.

Throughout the 1980s she represented Puerto Rico in many multi-sport events. She partnered with Gigi Fernández to win the doubles gold medal at the 1982 Central American and Caribbean Games and four years later in Santiago de los Caballeros was runner-up to Crissy González in the singles. She won two Pan American Games medals for Puerto Rico in doubles and was a singles bronze medalist at the 1985 Summer Universiade in Kobe.

A member of the Puerto Rican Sports Pavilion of Fame, Julia now lives in South Carolina and is the head tennis professional at the Rawls Creek Tennis and Swim Club.

References

External links
 
 

1965 births
Living people
Puerto Rican female tennis players
Universiade medalists in tennis
Universiade medalists for Puerto Rico
Medalists at the 1985 Summer Universiade
Pan American Games medalists in tennis
Pan American Games silver medalists for Puerto Rico
Pan American Games bronze medalists for Puerto Rico
Tennis players at the 1983 Pan American Games
Tennis players at the 1987 Pan American Games
Central American and Caribbean Games medalists in tennis
Central American and Caribbean Games gold medalists for Puerto Rico
Central American and Caribbean Games silver medalists for Puerto Rico
Central American and Caribbean Games bronze medalists for Puerto Rico
Competitors at the 1982 Central American and Caribbean Games
Competitors at the 1986 Central American and Caribbean Games
Sportspeople from San Juan, Puerto Rico
University of Puerto Rico at Mayagüez people
Medalists at the 1983 Pan American Games
Medalists at the 1987 Pan American Games
20th-century Puerto Rican women